The Burkina Faso national basketball team is the national basketball team of Burkina Faso, governed by the Fédération Burkinabe de Basketball.

Its main accomplishment was the qualification for the 2013 FIBA Africa Championship.

History
The qualification to the AfroBasket 2013 in Abidjan, Ivory Coast remains Burkina Faso's main accomplishment. Since then, the Burkina Faso "Stallions" have attempted to make a comeback. The Burkinabé did not make it through the AfroBasket 2015 qualification. In early 2021, they withdrew from the AfroBasket 2021 qualification. Burkina Faso has often struggled with the strong regional competition from neighbouring countries like Nigeria and Cote d'Ivoire in the African qualifying Zone 3.

The 1.80m (5 ft 11in) Point guard Herve Yaméogo had been team captain for many years. In a 2020 interview, the four-time champions with local side RCK highlighted the presence of Burkinabé national team players who play in Europe like Jean Victor Traore, Joris Bado and also others who play for universities in United States. Yet, he mentioned the failure of others who did not identify with their home nation.
Yameogo further stressed the inequality of financial assistance from the government compared to association football. Burkina Faso has the Palais des Sports de Ouaga 2000 which hosted the AfroBasket 2013 qualification and qualification games of the FIBA Africa Basketball League. According to Yaméogo, with better financing, it can host bigger basketball events.

Competitive record

FIBA AfroBasket
Burkina Faso has played at the AfroBasket main tournament once, in 2013.

African Games

Burkina Faso played at the African Games once, in 1973. Beginning with the 2019 event, regular basketball was replaced by 3x3 basketball.

Current roster
Team for the AfroBasket 2017 qualification: (last publicized squad)

Past Rosters
Team for the 2015 Afrobasket Qualification:

Team for the 2013 FIBA Africa Championship:

Head coach position
 Jean-Paul Rabatet – 2013 
 Bagouhinisse Dah - 2017

Kit

Manufacturer
2013: Adidas

See also
 Burkina Faso national under-19 basketball team
 Burkina Faso national under-17 basketball team
 Burkina Faso national 3x3 team
 Burkina Faso women's national basketball team

References

External links
Archived records of Burkina Faso team participations
Burkina Faso Men National Team 2013 Presentation at Afrobasket.com
Official website

Videos
 #AfroBasket - Day 2: Rwanda v Burkina Faso (dunk of the game - J. BADO) - Youtube.com video

Men's national basketball teams
Basketball
Basketball in Burkina Faso
Basketball teams in Burkina Faso
1964 establishments in Upper Volta